J2K may refer to:

 JPEG 2000, the image compression standard
 J2K-Codec, a proprietary library to decode JPEG 2000 images
 The US Coast Guard designation for the Fairchild 24 light transport aircraft
 Josh Young, former member of Flosstradamus, a musical duo
 Jason Black, member of Roll Deep, an English grime (music) crew